Bride's Hill, known also as Sunnybrook, is a historic house near Wheeler, Alabama. It is significant as an example of a Tidewater-type cottage built on a large slave plantation.  It was added to the Alabama Register of Landmarks and Heritage on April 16, 1985, and to the National Register of Historic Places on July 9, 1986.

History
A member of the Dandridge family, cousins of America's first First Lady (Martha Washington), is believed to have built Bride's Hill.  Its deep cellar, lighted by oblong ground-level windows, houses a basement kitchen-dining room.  On the main floor a broad central hall, with a graceful reverse-flight stairway rising to the low half-story above, separates two large rooms.  Allegedly a separate brick kitchen structure once stood to the rear. When absorbed into the vast Joseph Wheeler estate in 1907, the house and surrounding farm became known as Sunnybrook. Located in rural Lawrence County, the house has been unoccupied since the 1980s and is in a state of disrepair.

Architecture
Brought to the early Alabama plantation frontier by settlers from the Tidewater and Piedmont regions of Virginia, this vernacular house-type is usually a story-and-a-half in height, and characterized by prominent end chimneys flanking a steeply pitched roof often pierced by dormer windows.

See also
National Register of Historic Places listings in Lawrence County, Alabama

References

External links
  

Houses on the National Register of Historic Places in Alabama
Houses completed in 1830
National Register of Historic Places in Lawrence County, Alabama
Properties on the Alabama Register of Landmarks and Heritage
Tidewater-type cottage architecture in Alabama
Houses in Lawrence County, Alabama
1830 establishments in Alabama
Historic American Buildings Survey in Alabama